Idols South Africa V was the fifth season of South African reality interactive talent show based on the British talent show Pop Idol. It premiered on Sunday, 1 February 2009, with a summer vibe and new rules, after a short hiatus.
Instead of the search happening in autumn–winter as with previous seasons, the auditions began in mid-December and run through the holiday season.

Colin Moss was unable to be the host of Season 5 due to movie commitments and the role open for auditions. Among those who auditioned were Top Billing presenter Janez Vermeiren, SABC 3 continuity presenter and radio DJ Liezl van der Westhuizen, television presenter and DJ Pabi Moloi – most recently seen in SABC 1s The Amazing Date —and Sami Sabiti, co-host of Idols 1. M-Net made an official announcement that Liezl van der Westhuizen will be the new host. She was presented to viewers in the first episode of Season 5 when Colin was run over by a car in a scene and she took the reins from him as the new host.

Final voting disaster
At the finale, Sasha-Lee Davids was announced the winner, with 52.77% of the votes. Four days later, Idols SA announced that there had been problems with the voteline, and some of the votes that were sent before the cut-off time had not been counted. The investigation hit the front page of The Times on 8 May 2009 and later in the day it was announced on the Idols website that the recount had showed that Jason Hartman had received 200000 more votes than Davids (out of 2.3 million total votes in the finale's recount). After discussions between M-Net and FremantleMedia (the format owners), Hartman and Davids were declared joint winners. They both received identical full prizes. This was the first time a winner's prize was shared on an Idols show globally. Neither Hartman nor Davids ever appeared in the bottom 3 or 2 prior to the final.

Finals

Finalists
(ages stated at time of contest)

Elimination chart

Live Show Details

Heat 1 – Top 14 (22 February 2009)

Heat 2 – Top 12 (1 March 2009)

Live Show 1 (8 March 2009)
Theme: Greatest Hits

Live Show 2 (15 March 2009)
Theme: Divas and Crooners

Live Show 3 (22 March 2009)
Theme: New Millennium

Live Show 4 (29 March 2009)
Theme: Best of South Africa

Live Show 5 (5 April 2009)
Theme: Rock Classics

Live Show 6 (12 April 2009)
Theme: DJ's Choice

Live Show 7 (19 April 2009)
Theme: Unplugged

Live Show 8: Semi-final (26 April 2009)
Theme: Choices

Live final (3 May 2009)

References

External links
 Idols website

Season 05
2009 South African television seasons